The Anti-Inflation Act was an Act of the Parliament of Canada, introduced by Prime Minister Pierre Trudeau's government and passed in 1975, which aimed to slow down the rapidly increasing price and wage inflation.

Background 
Prior to 1975, the Bank of Canada had warned the government about the dangers of the current inflation which was roughly 10% per year. In response, the government introduced Bill C-73, the precursor to the Act, to the Parliament of Canada.

Previously, Pierre Trudeau had mocked the idea in the 1974 Canadian federal election.

The Act 
Amongst its many controls, it limited pay increases for federal public employees and those in companies with more than 500 employees to 10 per cent in the first year, 8 per cent the next, and 6 per cent thereafter. Additionally, the Anti-Inflation Board was created to set wages and prices.The price and wage controls were enforced until 1978, and the act was repealed in 1979. A similar program aimed only at the public sector was introduced in 1982.

Reaction 
The Act proved highly contentious and there was much debate over whether the Parliament of Canada had overstepped its powers in enacting the law. Consequently, the government put a reference question to the Supreme Court of Canada, and in 1976 the court passed down its opinion in Reference Re Anti-Inflation Act, which declared the law constitutional.

See also
 Incomes policy

References

Michelle Dust. Day of Protest October 14, 1976: An Expression of Solidarity.  Saskatoon: CUPE Local 1975, 1999.
Saskatchewan Federation of Labour. October 14, 1977: Demonstrate, Fall 1977.
Saskatchewan Federation of Labour. Saskatchewan Labour, Vol. 1, No. 2.  Regina, 1977.
Saskatchewan Federation of Labour. Saskatchewan Labour, Vol. 1, No. 3, National Day of Protest Special Issue.  Regina, 1977.
Saskatoon Labour Council. October 14, A National Day of Protest.  Saskatoon, 1977.

1975 in Canadian law
Canadian federal legislation
Economic policy in North America
Inflation
Repealed Canadian legislation